Vagn Harris Nielsen (born 28 November 1943) is a former Danish handball player who competed in the 1972 Summer Olympics.

He played club handball with Bolbro GF. In 1972 he was part of the Denmark men's national handball team which finished thirteenth in the Olympic tournament. He played three matches.

References
OL-deltagere fra odenseanske idrætsklubber
Sports-Reference profile

1943 births
Living people
Danish male handball players
Olympic handball players of Denmark
Handball players at the 1972 Summer Olympics